The crimson-hooded manakin (Pipra aureola), also known as orange-headed manakin, is a species of bird in the family Pipridae. It is found in Brazil, French Guiana, Guyana, Suriname, and Venezuela. Its natural habitats are subtropical or tropical swampland and heavily degraded former forest. It is the northernmost member of the genus Pipra. It forms a superspecies with both the Band-tailed Manakin (Pipra fasciicauda) and the Wire-tailed Manakin (Pipra filicauda).

References

 Snow, David W. (1963) "The display of the Orange-headed Manakin." Condor 65(1)

crimson-hooded manakin
Birds of the Guianas
Birds of the Amazon Basin
crimson-hooded manakin
crimson-hooded manakin
Birds of Brazil
Taxonomy articles created by Polbot